Bhola Nath Mullik was an Indian civil servant, spymaster and the second director of the Intelligence Bureau of India (IB). He served as the director of IB from July 15, 1950, to October 9, 1964. He was known to be a hardworking official, with close contacts with the then Union government. It was reported that Mullik had been a close associate of Jawaharlal Nehru, the erstwhile Indian prime minister and assisted Nehru to keep a watch on the movements of the relatives of Subhash Chandra Bose in the aftermath of Bose's disappearance in 1945. It was on his advice, that Nehru ordered for the establishment of Special Frontier Force (SFF) (also known as Establishment 22) for defending against the Chinese army in the Sino-Indian War of 1962. The Government of India awarded him Padma Bhushan, the third-highest Indian civilian award, in 1964.

Publications 

 B. N. Mullik (1971). My Years with Nehru: The Chinese Betrayal. Volume 1. Allied Publishers.
 B. N. Mullik (1971). My Years with Nehru: Kashmir. Volume 2. Allied Publishers.
 B. N. Mullik (1971). My Years with Nehru, 1948-1964. Volume 3. Allied Publishers.

See also
 Death of Subhas Chandra Bose
 R. N. Kao

References

Further reading

External links
 

Recipients of the Padma Bhushan in public affairs
Year of birth missing
Year of death missing
Indian civil servants
Spymasters
People from West Bengal
Directors of Intelligence Bureau (India)